OPAT may refer to:
 Tunisian Civil Aviation and Airports Authority
 Outpatient parenteral antibiotic therapy